Thembani Moeren Mkokeli (born 12 March 1984 in East London, South Africa) is a South African rugby union player, currently playing with the . He is a utility back that predominantly play as a fly-half or fullback, but also occasionally as a winger or centre.

Career

Youth

Mkokeli played for the  side at the 2000 Under-18 Craven Week tournament in Port Elizabeth. He played for the  side in 2001 (as a 17-year-old) and 2002 and earned a call-up to the South African Schools sides in the same seasons. In 2002, he was also named in the South African Under-19 side that played in the 2002 Under 19 Rugby World Championship in Italy and was once again included in the team for the 2003 tournament in Paris, from which the team returned victorious, their first win since 1994.

Border Bulldogs

He quickly established himself as a regular for the Bulldogs and became a regular fixture in the Border Bulldogs side over the next decade.

References

1984 births
Living people
Border Bulldogs players
Rugby union fly-halves
Rugby union fullbacks
Rugby union players from East London, Eastern Cape
South African rugby union players